Manly Palmer Hall (18 March 1901 – 29 August 1990) was a Canadian author, lecturer, astrologer and mystic. Over his 70-year career he gave thousands of lectures and published over 150 volumes, of which the best known is The Secret Teachings of All Ages (1928). In 1934 he founded the Philosophical Research Society in Los Angeles.

Early life
Hall was born in 1901 in Peterborough, Ontario, Canada, to Louise Palmer Hall, a chiropractor and member of the Rosicrucian Fellowship, and William S. Hall, a dentist. Hall is said to have never known his father. In 1919, Hall moved to Los Angeles to reunite with his birth mother who was living in Santa Monica. After moving in with her, he very soon after became drawn to mysticism, esoteric philosophies and their underlying principles.

Career
In 1919, Hall took over as preacher of the Church of the People, located at Trinity Auditorium in downtown Los Angeles. Less than a year later, Hall booked his first lecture on the topic of reincarnation. Hall was ordained a minister in the Church of the People on May 17th, 1923. Only a few days after his ordainment, he was elected "permanent pastor" of the church. His first publications consisted of two small pamphlets, The Breastplate of the High Priest (1920) and Wands and Serpents (1927). Between 1922 and 1923 he wrote three books: The Initiates of the Flame (1922), The Ways of the Lonely Ones (1922), and The Lost Keys of Freemasonry (1923).

During the early 1920s, Caroline Lloyd and her daughter Estelle, members of a family who controlled an oil field in Ventura County, California, began sending a large portion of their income to Hall.  With these funds, Hall traveled throughout Europe and Asia to study the lives, customs, and religions of the people in those regions. While visiting London in the early 1930s, Hall acquired from an auction agent at Sotheby's, a substantial collection of rare books and manuscripts about alchemy and esotericism. Owing to economic conditions resulting from the Great Depression, he acquired the collection for a price much lower than normal. Caroline Lloyd died in 1946 and in her will left Hall a house, $15,000 in cash, and an annual percentage of her family's oil field shares, valued at approximately $10,000 per year, for the next 38 years.

The Secret Teachings of All Ages
By 1928, Hall had become sufficiently known and respected as an interpreter and lecturer of many ancient writings. He utilized print and word-of-mouth advertising to solicit public funding to finance his book The Secret Teachings of All Ages (1928). The HS Crocker Company of San Francisco agreed to publish his works if he could secure the interest of book designer John Henry Nash, who had worked as a printer for the Vatican."

After The Secret Teachings of All Ages circulated, Hall became increasingly influential on the metaphysical movement sweeping the United States. His book challenged assumptions about society's spiritual roots making readers view their spirituality in new and diverse ways. He subtitled his book to "the proposition that concealed within the emblematic figures, allegories and rituals of the ancients is a secret doctrine concerning the inner mysteries of life, which doctrine has been preserved in toto among a small band of initiated minds." As one writer put it: "The result was a gorgeous, dreamlike book of mysterious symbols, concise essays and colorful renderings of mythical beasts rising out of the sea, and angelic beings with lions' heads presiding over somber initiation rites in torch-lit temples of ancestral civilizations that had mastered latent powers beyond the reach of modern man."

In 1988, Hall wrote: "The greatest knowledge of all time should be available to the twentieth century not only in the one shilling editions of the Bohn Library in small type and shabby binding, but in a book that would be a monument, not merely a coffin. John Henry Nash agreed with me."

Further publications and lectures
After the success of The Secret Teachings of All Ages Hall went on to publish several books, the major of which included, The Dionysian Artificers (1936), Freemasonry of the Ancient Egyptians (1937), and Masonic Orders of Fraternity (1950). Continuing his career into his seventies and beyond, Hall delivered approximately 8,000 lectures in the United States and abroad, authored over 150 books and essays, and wrote countless magazine articles. Hall appears in the introduction to the 1938 film When Were You Born, a murder mystery that uses astrology as a key plot point. Hall wrote the original story for the film (screenplay by Anthony Coldeway) and is also credited as the narrator.

In 1942, Hall spoke to a large audience at Carnegie Hall, on "The Secret Destiny of America," which later became a book of the same title. Through a series of stories, his book alleged that a secret order of philosophers created the idea of America as a country based on religious freedom and self-governance. In one of the stories that Hall cites as evidence of America's exceptionalism, he claims that an angel was present at the signing of the Declaration of Independence, and inspiring them with God's words. President Ronald Reagan is reported to have adopted ideas and phrasing from The Secret Destiny of America (1944) in his speeches and essays for his allegorical use of the City upon a Hill.

Hall returned in 1945 for another well-attended lecture at Carnegie Hall, titled: "Plato's Prophecy of Worldwide Democracy."

Personal life
Hall and his followers went to extreme lengths to keep any rumors or information that could tarnish his image from being publicized, and little is known about his first marriage. On 28 April 1930, Hall married Fay B. deRavenne, who had been his secretary for five years. The marriage was not a happy one; his friends never discussed it, and Hall removed virtually all information about her from his papers following her suicide on 22 February 1941.  Following a long friendship, on 5 December 1950, Hall married Marie Schweikert Bauer (following her divorce from George Bauer), and the marriage, though stressful, was happier than his first. Marie Schweikert Bauer Hall died April 21, 2005.

In 1934, Hall founded the Philosophical Research Society (PRS) in Los Angeles, California, a nonprofit organization dedicated to the study of religion, mythology, metaphysics, and the occult. The PRS still maintains a research library of over 50,000 volumes, and also sells and publishes metaphysical and spiritual books, mostly those authored by Hall. After his death, some of Manly Hall's rare alchemy books were sold to keep the PRS in operation. "Acquisition of the Manly Palmer Hall Collection in 1995 provided the Getty Research Institute with one of the world's leading collections of alchemy, esoterica, and hermetica."

Hall was a Knight Patron of the Masonic Research Group of San Francisco, with which he was associated for a number of years prior to his Masonic affiliations. On 28 June 1954, Hall was initiated as a Freemason into Jewel Lodge No. 374, San Francisco (now the United Lodge); passed September 20th,1954; and raised November 22nd, 1954. He took the Scottish Rite Degrees a year later.
He later received his 32° in the Valley of San Francisco AASR (SJ). On 8 December 1973 (47 years after writing The Secret Teachings of All Ages), Hall was recognized as a 33° Mason (the highest honor conferred by the Supreme Council of the Scottish Rite) at a ceremony held at the Philosophical Research Society (PRS).

Selected works
(1922) The Initiates of the Flame
(1923) The Lost Keys of Freemasonry
(1925) The Noble Eightfold Path: Teachings of the Great Buddha, in 7 Parts
(1925) Shadow Forms: A Collection of Occult Stories
(1928) The Secret Teachings of All Ages
(1929) Lectures on Ancient Philosophy: An Introduction to the Study and Application of Rational Procedure
(1933) Introduction to Max Heindel's Blavatsky and The Secret Doctrine
(1942) How to Understand Your Bible
(1943) Lady of Dreams: A Fable in the Manner of the Chinese
(1944) The Secret Destiny of America
(1944) The Guru by His Disciple: The Way of the East
(1951) America's Assignment with Destiny
(1980) The Blessed Angels: A Monograph
(1984) Lectures in Ancient Philosophy: An Introduction to Practical Ideals
(1988) Meditation Symbols in Eastern & Western Mysticism: Mysteries of the Mandala
The Adepts Series
A Monthly Letter Devoted to Spiritual and Philosophical Problems
Atlantis: An Interpretation
Symbolic Essays
Noah and His Wonderful Ark

References

Further reading

Pontiac, Ronnie (2012) "The Maestro and the Boy: The Kindness of Manly P. Hall"

Wilson, Brandon (2021) “ “A Forgotten Father of the New Age: Manly P. Hall and His Impact on American Metaphysical Religion”

External links

 

1901 births
1990 deaths
American Freemasons
American occult writers
Atlantis
Canadian emigrants to the United States
Esotericists
Hermeticism
20th-century mystics
People from Peterborough, Ontario
Philosophers from California
Writers from Los Angeles
Writers from Ontario
Tarotologists
20th-century Canadian philosophers